Animus may refer to:

Philosophy
 Anima and animus, Jungian concepts
 The ancient Roman concept of animus or soul
 Animus (journal), an electronic journal of philosophy and humanities

Music
 "Animus", a track on the album Music of the Spheres by Mike Oldfield
 "Animus", a track on the album A New Era of Corruption by Whitechapel
 "Animus", a track on the album Soundtracks for the Blind by Swans

Fiction
 Animus (Doctor Who), a character from the Doctor Who serial The Web Planet
 Animus (Encantadia), a character in Etheria
 ANIMUS (graphic novel), a 2018 graphic novel by Antoine Revoy
 Animus (Marvel Comics), a character in the Marvel Universe
 Animus, the alter-ego of the Marvel Comics character Vamp
 "Animus" (Sanctuary), an episode of the TV series Sanctuary
 Animus, a kind of magic in the novel Wings of Fire by Tui T. Sutherland

Games
 Animus: Stand Alone, a Nintendo Switch game
 Animus, a device in the Assassin's Creed series able to re-live the genetic memories of its user's ancestors
 Animus, a Human or Daedric soul in The Elder Scrolls series
 Animus elemental, a weapon in the Neverwinter Nights 2 video game
 Animus, an ability unique to each beast in the game Warmachine and Hordes

Law
 Animus, a term used in a variety of legal contexts
 Animus nocendi, an intent to do harm to another
 Animus revertendi, "with intention to return", in connection with animals and property rights

See also